Tyree may refer to:

People

With the surname
Alexander K. Tyree (1915–2006), American naval officer
Breein Tyree (born 1998), American basketball player
David Tyree (born 1980), American football player
Earl Tyree (1890–1954), American baseball player
Elizabeth Tyree (1865–1952), American actress
Ella Tyree, American medical researcher
Evans Tyree (1854–1920), American doctor and AME Bishop
James C. Tyree (1957–2011), American financier
John A. Tyree (1911–2004), American admiral
Omar Tyree (born 1969), American novelist
Ralph Burke Tyree (1921–1979), American painter
Randy Tyree (born 1940), American politician
William Tyree (1921–2013), Australian engineer

Americans with the given name

In American football
Tyree Davis (born 1970)
Tyree Gillespie (born 1998)
Tyree Hollins (born 1990)
Tyree Jackson (born 1997)
Tyree Kinnel (born 1997)
Tyree Robinson (born 1994)
Tyree St. Louis (born 1997)
Tyree Talton (born 1976)
Tyree Wilson (born 2002)

In other fields
Tyree H. Bell (1815–1902), Confederate general
Tyree Blocker (born 1953), law enforcement officer
Tyree Cooper, record producer
Tyree Glenn (1912–1974), musician
Tyree Guyton (born 1955), artist
Tyree Scott (1940–2003), activist
Tyree Washington (born 1976), sprinter

Places
 Tyree, Georgia, United States
 Taieri Island, New Zealand (once spelt Tyree)
 Mount Tyree, Antarctica

Fictional elements
Clinton Tyree, a character in Carl Hiaasen's comedic crime novels
 Tyree, a fictional planet introduced in  "Image in the Sand", a Star Trek: Deep Space 9 episode

See also
 Tiree, island in Scotland
 Tyrie, a surname
 Tyreek, given name
 Tyre (disambiguation)